Jin Pil-jung (Hangul: 진필중, Hanja: 陳弼重), (born October 13, 1972) is a former South Korean baseball pitcher. He is currently the General 2nd Pitching Coach for the Lotte Giants. 

Jin began his career as a starting pitcher but after three seasons converted to a late-inning reliever.

Jin was part of the South Korean baseball team which won the bronze medal at the 2000 Olympic Games in Sydney, Australia. Pitching for the Doosan Bears, he led the KBO in saves in the years 2000 to 2002.

In December 2002 Jin was unsuccessfully posted to Major League Baseball. The Bears rejected the winning MLB team's highest bid of $25,000. Instead, Jin became a free agent and signed with the Kia Tigers.

See also 
 List of KBO career saves leaders

References

External links

Database Olympics profile

1972 births
Living people
South Korean baseball players
Doosan Bears players
Kia Tigers players
LG Twins players
Baseball players at the 2000 Summer Olympics
Olympic baseball players of South Korea
Olympic bronze medalists for South Korea
Kiwoom Heroes players
Olympic medalists in baseball

Medalists at the 2000 Summer Olympics